Harnischia is a genus of European non-biting midges in the subfamily Chironominae of the bloodworm family Chironomidae.

Species
H. angularis Albu & Botnariuc, 1966
H. curtilamellata (Malloch, 1915)
H. fuscimana Kieffer, 1921
H. incidata Townes, 1945

References

Chironomidae
Diptera of Europe
Taxa named by Jean-Jacques Kieffer